Carved in Sand is the third regular studio album by The Mission, released in 1990. It reached #7 in the UK Albums Chart, making it the second of two top ten albums and overall best-selling album in the band's career. Four singles were released from the album: "Butterfly on a Wheel" (#12, January 1990), "Deliverance", "Into the Blue" (#32, June 1990), "Hands Across the Ocean" / "Amelia" (#28, November 1990). The band had invited members of its fan club to help select the tracks for the album.

A "companion" album with outtakes that were not included on Carved in Sand - entitled Grains of Sand - was released in November the same year.

A deluxe two-disc edition of the album was released in February 2008. It included outtakes, the album Grains of Sand and some live cover songs from the 1970s, performed under the name The Metal Gurus (a reference to the song "Metal Guru" by T. Rex, which was one of the tracks covered).

Carved in Sand marked the return of Tim Palmer as producer. The album was recorded at Jacobs Studios and mixed at Swanyard Studios.

Track listing 
Except where noted: all music by Adams, Brown, Hinkler and Hussey; and words by Hussey

1990 release 
 "Amelia" - 2:55
 "Into the Blue" - 4:11
 "Butterfly on a Wheel" - 5:44
 "Sea of Love" - 5:23
 "Deliverance" - 6:03
 "Grapes of Wrath" - 4:20
 "Belief" - 7:34
 "Paradise (Will Shine Like the Moon)" - 3:54
 "Hungry as the Hunter" - 5:14
 "Lovely" - 1:59

2008 reissue 
Carved in Sand
 "Amelia" - 2:54
 "Into the Blue" - 4:12
 "Butterfly on a Wheel" - 5:44
 "Sea of Love" - 5:20
 "Deliverance" - 6:04
 "Grapes of Wrath" - 4:20
 "Belief" - 7:35
 "Paradise (Will Shine Like the Moon)" - 3:53
 "Hungry as the Hunter" - 5:14
 "Lovely" - 2:06
Bonus tracks
  "Hands Across the Ocean" (Andy Partridge Mix) - 3:57
 "Divided We Fall" (Demo) - 3:44
 "Sea of Love" (Demo) - 5:11
 "Hungry as the Hunter" (Demo) - 5:36
 "Bird of Passage" (Demo) - 5:41
 "Butterfly on a Wheel" (Hoedown C&W Version) -  3:28
 "Hands Across the Ocean" (White Elephant Mix) - 3:55

Grains of Sand
 "Hands Across the Ocean" - 3:49
 "The Grip of Disease" - 4:13
 "Divided We Fall" - 3:41
 "Mercenary" - 2:51
 "Mr. Pleasant" (Ray Davies) - 2:52
 "Kingdom Come (Forever and Again)" - 4:58
 "Heaven Sends You" - 4:54
 "Sweet Smile of a Mystery" - 3:55
 "Tower of Strength" (The Casbah Mix) - 4:31
 "Butterfly on a Wheel" (Troubadour Mix) - 4:30
 "Love" (John Lennon) - 1:52
 "Bird of Passage (6:38)
Bonus tracks The Metal Gurus - Live at Aston Villa Dec '89
  "Ballroom Blitz" (Nicky Chinn & Mike Chapman) - 3:40
 "Cracked Actor" (David Bowie) - 2:49
 "Mama Weer All Crazee Now" (Jim Lea, Noddy Holder) - 3:47
 "Get It On" (Marc Bolan) - 4:00
 "Caroline" (Robert Young, Francis Rossi) - 3:50
 "Virginia Plain" (Bryan Ferry) - 2:51
 "Metal Guru" (Marc Bolan) - 2:28
 "Blockbuster"  (Nicky Chinn, Mike Chapman) - 3:01
 "Merry Xmas Everybody" (James Lea, Neville Holder) - 3:15

Personnel
The Mission
 Craig Adams – bass guitar
 Mick Brown – drums
 Simon Hinkler – guitar, keyboards
 Wayne Hussey – vocals, guitar
Additional musicians
 Reeves Gabrels – additional guitar on "Into the Blue" and "Hungry as the Hunter"
 Baluji Shrivastav – sitar on "Sea of Love"
 Guy Chambers – piano on "Grapes of Wrath"

References

1990 albums
The Mission (band) albums
Albums produced by Tim Palmer
Mercury Records albums